Interceptor is a 2022 action drama film directed by Matthew Reilly from a screenplay that he co-wrote with Stuart Beattie. The film stars Elsa Pataky and Luke Bracey. It is about terrorists who want to launch a nuclear attack on the United States with stolen missiles. When the terrorists attack a remote offshore missile interceptor platform that could stop their missiles, 
an officer (Pataky) defends the facility with courage and resourcefulness.

Plot
The United States has two interceptor launch sites aimed at intercepting any nuclear warhead launches; the first, Fort Greely in Alaska, is attacked by unknown assailants presumably affiliated with a terrorist faction, while 16 nuclear warheads are simultaneously seized from Russian territory. The second site is a remote platform in the middle of the Pacific Ocean. U.S. Army Captain J. J. Collins is recently reassigned to the latter of the two interceptor missile launch sites. Following the conclusion of a high-profile case where she reported sexual misconduct by one of her superiors, she experienced hazing, bullying and threats from her peers in the military as revenge, hence her new deployment to this remote station.

Under the command of Lt. Colonel Marshall, and working alongside Beaver and Shah in the station's command center, Collins finds herself as part of the last line of defense after the hostile takeover of Fort Greely. The station is infiltrated by a small group of operatives led by ex-military intelligence soldier Kessel, who promptly kill Marshall and the other occupants of the base, leaving only Collins, Shah, and an unconscious Baker, who was grazed by a stray bullet, as the survivors, holed up in the command center. The infiltrators attempt to negotiate entry into the command center, by which they can disarm the interceptor system and leave the continental U.S. open to nuclear attack from the sixteen stolen warheads. They are rebuffed however, and attempt to forcibly enter instead with blowtorches. An operative launches a surprise attack after entering via a floor hatch, but is defeated and killed by Collins and Shah. Beaver regains consciousness and reveals himself to be an inside man for the infiltrators and motivated by a big pay day and xenophobia, holding both Collins and Shah at gunpoint while allowing Kessel and the remaining operatives to enter and assume control.

Kessel hijacks a live feed and streams his manifesto about the failures in the history of the United States online, naming the sixteen American cities to be destroyed, and instructing the terrorist faction to launch the nukes immediately. Collins breaks free of her restraints and locks Kessel, Beaver, and a henchman back out of the command center, while defeating and killing Kira, the lone enemy operative still in the room, and another henchman. Kessel attempts to force Collins to surrender, torturing her father, but she refuses and her father is apparently killed when the transmission is cut. Kessel turns to plan B, initiating the station's scuttling protocol, hoping to sink the station if he cannot take control of it. As the station begins to sink, Shah volunteers to drop through the floor hatch to the ocean below and manually re-engage the station's hatches, in order to slow down the station from sinking, such that the interceptors are still able to launch and destroy the warheads when they eventually pass through the airspace overhead. Shah succeeds, but he is killed by Beaver.

Collins decides to make a risky gamble, hiding in the command center and letting Kessel, Beaver, and the remaining henchman take over and disable the seemingly empty center. Her ruse works, with Beaver going to check up on the station's roof to find and eliminate her. Collins is able to stealthily dispatch the remaining henchman while Kessel flees the room. Grabbing a laptop, Collins ascends to the roof and plugs the device in, hoping to manually launch the interceptor missiles using this method. She is found by Beaver however, and the two engage in hand to hand combat, with Collins emerging victorious after using razor wire to decapitate Beaver. Kessel, who had called in a Russian submarine to pick up the team of operatives earlier, finds Collins just as she successfully launches the interceptor missiles with a fraction of a second left before the nukes would have crossed the point of interception. His plan failed, he engages in combat with Collins, who manages to defeat and subdue him, just as the Russian submarine ascends from the sea. A pair of Russians emerge from the submarine tower, but rather than shooting Collins, they fire at Kessel instead, and the Russian Captain salutes Collins before departing.

Collins later recovers from her ordeal in the hospital, and she is personally given a promotion by the U.S. president for her efforts. She also receives a visit of her father who had been rescued by friends who had witnessed his plight on the live broadcast, and he comforts her over her grief for Shah's death.

Cast

In addition, Mark Dessaix appears as the dismissive game theory strategist advising the President, while one of the film's executive producers, Chris Hemsworth, has an uncredited cameo as the laid-back salesman at a big box consumer electronics store.

Production 
Reilly began writing the screenplay for Interceptor in 2017. The script's action took place predominantly on one set, as Reilly wanted to ensure that the film's budget would not go over $15 million. Beattie was sold on the script that he contacted Reilly asking if he could rewrite it, to which the latter agreed.

Beattie shared the script with producers, who were told that Reilly intended to serve as director. Reilly experienced some pushback on this, but was successful in maintaining his position as director. Netflix greenlit the film, and Elsa Pataky was signed to perform as the lead character, JJ Collins. She prepared for the role by training for up to five hours each day with the help of her husband, Chris Hemsworth, who served as an executive producer and also had an uncredited role as a television store sales clerk.

Filming took place in New South Wales, Australia over a period of 33 days, beginning on 29 March 2021.

Release 
Interceptor was released globally on Netflix on 3 June 2022. Plans to release the film theatrically in Australia in 2021 were announced, but fell through. The film instead had a short theatrical release in Australia on 26 May 2022, the week before its worldwide Netflix release.

Reception
 On Metacritic, the film has a weighted average score of 51 out of 100 based on reviews from 6 critics, indicating "mixed or average reviews".

References

External links
 

2022 films
2022 action drama films
2022 directorial debut films
2020s English-language films
American action drama films
Australian action drama films
English-language Netflix original films
Films about nuclear war and weapons
Films about terrorism
Films about the United States Army
Films set in the Pacific Ocean
Films shot in New South Wales
Films with screenplays by Stuart Beattie
2020s American films
Girls with guns films